Zinaida Mikhailovna Kiriyenko (9 July 1933 – 12 February 2022) was a Russian actress and singer, Honored Artist of the RSFSR (1965), People's Artist of the RSFSR (1977). She was known for her roles in the films And Quiet Flows the Don, Fate of a Man, and Chronicle of Flaming Years.

Career
From 1958 to 1959, Zinaida worked in the Moscow Pushkin Drama Theatre. From 1961, she worked at the National Film Actors' Theatre for more than thirty years. 

Kiriyenko gained USSR fame after playing the role of Natalya in the film "And Quiet Flows the Don" by her teacher Sergei Gerasimov. Recognized Soviet movie star of the 1950s-1960s. 

The actress was not filmed for a long time. As she herself noted in interviews, this was due to a conflict with a certain high-ranking official (First Deputy Chairman of the USSR State Film Committee Vladimir Baskakov), who blacklisted her. During the acting downtime, she traveled around cities and gave solo concerts, becoming famous as a singer.

Kiriyenko again rose to popularity after her role in the film "Earthly Love", directed by Yevgeny Matveyev.

Personal life and death
On 10 February 2022, Kiriyenko was admitted to a Moscow hospital with a positive test for COVID-19. Whilst hospitalised, she suffered a stroke and died on 12 February 2022, at the age of 88.

References

External links

1933 births
2022 deaths
20th-century Russian actresses
20th-century Russian women singers
20th-century Russian singers
Russian stage actresses
Gerasimov Institute of Cinematography alumni
People's Artists of the RSFSR
Honored Artists of the RSFSR
Recipients of the USSR State Prize
People from Makhachkala